Paul Chiu (born 19 February 1942) is a Taiwanese politician. He was the Vice Premier of Taiwan from 2008–2009.

ROC Vice Premiership

Vice Premier resignation
Chiu and Premier Liu Chao-shiuan resigned on 10 September 2009 due to the slow disaster response by the government to Typhoon Morakot which struck Taiwan in August 2009.

References

Living people
Taiwanese Ministers of Finance
Kuomintang politicians in Taiwan
1942 births
Ohio State University alumni
National Taiwan University alumni